JBC may refer to:

Organizations 
Editora JBC (Japan Brazil Communication), a Brazilian publisher
Jamaica Broadcasting Corporation, a public broadcasting company
Japan Broadcasting Corporation,
Japan Bowling Congress, the major sanctioning body for bowling in Japan

Jiban Bima Corporation, the state-run life insurance company of Bangladesh
John Bosco College, former name of De La Salle John Bosco College in the Philippines
Johnson Bible College, in Knoxville, Tennessee, USA
Jamestown Business College, a for-profit institution in Jamestown, New York
Jelly Belly-Kenda, UCI Code JBC, Jelly Belly Cycling Team, an elite men's cycling team
Judicial and Bar Council, a body that makes recommendations to fill judicial vacancies in the Philippines
JBC, a Korean-language radio station in Los Angeles, California, see KYPA
Joint Biosecurity Centre, UK government scientific body responding to COVID-19 outbreaks

Science, technology, and computers 
JBoss Cache, a component of JBoss Middleware that caches frequently accessed Java objects to improve application performance
Journal of Biological Chemistry, a publication of The American Society for Biochemistry and Molecular Biology
Jinbei (car), a car brand name of Brilliance Jinbei Automobile Co., Ltd.

Other uses 
Joint Battle Command-Platform, or JBC-P, see Project Manager Force XXI Battle Command Brigade and Below
Jeremy Kennedy (born 1992), Canadian mixed martial artist nicknamed JBC